The Junkers Profly Junkers Trike is a German ultralight trike, designed by Junkers Profly of Kulmbach and manufactured under contract in the Czech Republic. When it was available the aircraft was supplied complete and ready-to-fly.

The aircraft is no longer listed on the Junkers Profly website and production appears to have been completed.

Design and development
The Junkers Trike was originally designed as a single seater or "tight" two-seater, but later stretched to provide comfortable accommodation for two occupants.

It features a cable-braced hang glider-style high-wing, weight-shift controls, a single-seat or two-seats-in-tandem open cockpit with an aerodynamically streamlined cockpit fairing, tricycle landing gear with wheel pants and a single engine in pusher configuration.

The aircraft fuselage is made from fibre glass, with its single or double surface wing covered in Dacron sailcloth. The typical wing used is of  span, is supported by a single tube-type kingpost and uses an "A" frame weight-shift control bar. The standard powerplant factory supplied was the twin cylinder, liquid-cooled, two-stroke, dual-ignition  Rotax 582 engine.

A number of different wings can be fitted to the basic carriage, including those made by Bautek and La Mouette. The aircraft was certified in Germany to DULV standards.

Specifications (Junkers Trike)

References

External links

Photo of two seat version

Junkers Trike
2000s German sport aircraft
2000s German ultralight aircraft
Single-engined pusher aircraft
Ultralight trikes